Excel Academy at Francis M. Wood High School is a public adult high school located in Baltimore, Maryland, United States, part of the Baltimore City Public Schools.  The school is named for Francis M. Wood, Baltimore's Director of Negro Schools from 1925 to 1943.

References

External links
 Excel Academy at Francis M. Wood High School at Baltimore City Schools
 Excel Academy at Francis M. Wood High School - Maryland Report Card

Public schools in Baltimore
Public high schools in Maryland
Alternative schools in the United States